Dihydropyrimidinase-related protein 3 is an enzyme that in humans is encoded by the DPYSL3 gene.
A recent bioinformatics study suggested that the DPYSL3 gene might have a prognostic role in neuroblastoma.

References

Further reading